Dexia Crediop S.p.A. is an Italian bank specializing in financing public infrastructure. It was part of Dexia Group, as the owner of 70% shares. Banco Popolare, Banca Popolare di Milano and Banca Popolare dell'Emilia Romagna owned 10% each as minority shareholders.

History
Consorzio di Credito per le Opere Pubbliche (Crediop) was found by Alberto Beneduce in 1919 as a public entity.

Sanpaolo Bank
The privatization was started in late 1980s. In 1989 Istituto Bancario San Paolo di Torino was the second largest owner for 35%, which was purchased from Istituto Nazionale della Previdenza Sociale and Istituto Nazionale Assicurazioni, with Cassa Depositi e Prestiti (CDP) retained 60.7%. In late 1991 Sanpaolo Group bought 50% ownership from CDP. Due to Legge Amato, In 1992 it became a società per azioni (limited company) from statutory corporation , which San Paolo Bank Holding S.p.A. (52.3%), Istituto Bancario San Paolo di Torino S.p.A. (37%) and Cassa Depositi e Prestiti S.p.A. (10.7%) were the shareholders. In 1995 the bank was wholly owned by Sanpaolo bank group. The bank followed the parent company to merge with Istituto Mobiliare Italiano to form Sanpaolo IMI in 1998.

Dexia
Circa 1997 Dexia acquired 40% shares from Sanpaolo. In 1999 the banking group sold an additional 20% shares to Dexia for €218 million, making Dexia became the major shareholder for 60%. Sanpaolo IMI sold further 40% shares to Dexia for about €403 million, However, Dexia re-sold the 40% shares to Banca Popolare di Verona – Banco SGSP (became part of Banco Popolare in 2007), Banca Popolare di Milano, Banca Popolare dell'Emilia Romagna and Banca Popolare di Bergamo – Credito Varesino (through BPB Partecipazioni), by buying 4% shares and convertible bonds equivalent to 6% share capital, for a total of 200 billion lire each (about €103 million for each bank). Banca Popolare di Bergamo withdrew in 2001.

After the European debt crisis in 2010s, the parent company Dexia faced financial difficulties which Crediop became a for-sale assets to the group, or otherwise would run-off the bank.

After the merger of Banco Popolare and Banca Popolare di Milano in 2017, Banco BPM would be the second largest shareholder of Crediop.

See also
 Cassa Depositi e Prestiti

References

Banks established in 1919
Italian companies established in 1919
banks of Italy
Companies based in Rome
Sanpaolo IMI
Banco Popolare
BPER Banca
Banca Popolare di Milano
Formerly government-owned companies of Italy